Lawrence Arthur Adamson, CMG, (20 April 1860 – 14 December 1932) was a schoolmaster of Wesley College, Melbourne, Australia.

Early life

Lawrence Adamson was born at Douglas, Isle of Man, the second son of Lawrence William Adamson. LL.D., Grand Seneschal of the IoM and his wife Annie Jane née Flint. In 1866, the family went to Newcastle-on-Tyne, where his father served as High Sheriff of Northumberland in 1900. At fourteen years of age Lawrence went to Rugby School, where he educated in the Classics, and represented his school at football. At the University of Oxford he read Classics and Jurisprudence, taking the degree of MA, before being called to the Bar in 1885. That year Adamson was arrested with another man for sexual involvement with two teenagers: the heir and second son of the 4th Earl of Rosslyn. The case was smothered, but he was forced to emigrate to Australia, with the cover story that a bad attack of pleurisy required immediate relocation to a warmer climate. Adamson arrived to practise at the Sydney Bar in December 1885, but finding its summer humidity uncongenial, he moved to Melbourne.

Teaching career
Adamson applied for admission to the Melbourne Bar, and while waiting occupied himself with private coaching; in January 1887 was appointed senior resident master at Wesley College, Melbourne under Arthur Way. He also became sports master and chairman of the games committee, and, with James Cuthbertson of Geelong Grammar School, helped to frame a code of rules for inter-school athletics. In 1892 he became second master and was also resident tutor and lecturer at Trinity College. In 1893 he became resident tutor at Trinity College (University of Melbourne) and until 1896 lectured there in the evenings while teaching at Wesley by day. In 1898 he joined Otto Krome as joint-headmaster of the University High School. Four years later he was appointed headmaster of Wesley College after he indicated he would be responsible financially for the school's growth. Inheritances had made Adamson a wealthy man.

Headmaster of Wesley College
Melbourne had been slowly recovering from the effects of a land boom and all the public schools had suffered and Wesley's troubles had been greater than all others. When Adamson took charge only one hundred boys of the previous year had returned to school. By the end of the year, 243 were on the roll and the attendance gradually rose until it reached 600 in 1930. Adamson wanted no more because he did not believe in large public schools, and always held that it was impossible for the head to know the boys in a school whose numbers were much over 500. While promoting scholarship, Adamson encouraged athletics at Wesley and quickly set up an ideal of sportsmanship of which the keynote was that boys should learn to 'win decently and lose decently'. He advocated good manners with pithy illustrations on the effect of them, he instilled a sense of honour, he believed in hero-worship, but all the while he was mindful of practical things. His school was the first to have medical examinations for all boys, and the knowledge of a boy's physical condition was applied to his work in class. Justice was the basis of all his work, and he became not only efficient as a headmaster but thoroughly popular with the boys. There was no want of respect in his nickname "Dicky" and there was a really genuine affection.

Influence and committees

Adamson left a stamp of influence outside his school. He was active during the early years of the Victorian Amateur Athletic Association (president 1901–1905). For 37 years he was president of the Victorian Amateur Football Association, and he did good work for the Victorian Cricket Association during difficult times as a delegate, honorary treasurer and president. In education he was not merely the headmaster of a public school. As early as 1892 he was one of the founders of the Victorian Institute of Schoolmasters, and his continual interest in the whole question of education enabled him to do valuable work, before and after the passing of the Registration of Schools Act in 1905, as a member of the registration board, the council of public education, the Faculty of Arts at the University of Melbourne, and the University Council. This by no means exhausts the list of committees on which he served but none of these interfered with his work as headmaster, which went steadily on until a long illness led to his retirement in October 1932. He died a few weeks later on 14 December 1932.

Adamson became headmaster of Wesley at age 42, a quiet, somewhat portly man of medium height. He made no special claim to scholarship, he was far too busy to be able to give much time to studies, but he liked to take a class and he got to know the many generations of boys who passed through his hands. He was fond of poetry, he wrote the words and music of some of the school songs, and he collected and appreciated old silver, china and furniture. He was the first to import an aeroplane into Australia, a Wilbur Wright biplane in 1909, although he did not fly it himself.

Adamson could still delight in stories like Treasure Island and A Gentleman of France, and he could read Rudyard Kipling's Stalky & Co. with an appreciation granted to few schoolmasters. He was a lay canon of St Paul's Cathedral, Melbourne, and a practical Christian of the kind that boys could understand. To read so moving an address as that given to the boys after the close of the War enables one to realise his power over them. He never married. His portrait by William Beckwith McInnes is at Wesley College.

References

External links
 Wesley College home
 L. A. Adamson  –  For the Class of 2004
 www.AdamsonAncestry.com
 www.burkespeerage.com

1860 births
1932 deaths
People educated at Rugby School
Alumni of Oriel College, Oxford
Manx emigrants to Australia
Members of the Inner Temple
People from Douglas, Isle of Man
People from Melbourne
Australian headmasters
Companions of the Order of St Michael and St George
19th-century Australian educators
20th-century Australian educators
Wesley College (Victoria)